Dr William Evans Hoyle FRSE (28 January 1855 – 7 February 1926) was a noted British zoologist. A specialist in deep sea creatures he worked on classification and illustrations from the Challenger Expedition from 1882 to 1888.

Life
Hoyle was born in Manchester the son of William Jennings Hoyle, an engraver.

He was educated at Owens College and at Exeter College and Christ Church, Oxford where he obtained a Bachelor of Arts in 1877, Master of Arts in 1882 and a Doctor of Science, he was also Member of the Royal College of Surgeons.

He was the Director of the Manchester Museum from 1889 to 1909 and then was the first director of the National Museum of Wales from 1909 up to his retirement in 1926. Trained as a medical anatomist, Hoyle is most famous for his monographic studies on cephalopods from major exploring expeditions of his era including the Challenger, the Albatross, the British National Antarctic Expedition and the Scottish National Antarctic Expedition.

In 1883 he was elected a Fellow of the Royal Society of Edinburgh. His proposers were Sir John Murray, Morrison Watson, John Gray McKendrick and James Cossar Ewart.

Hoyle authored many first descriptions of cephalopods, including (but not limited to) those tabled below.

In 1906 he served as President of the Museums Association of Great Britain.

He died in Porthcawl in Wales on 7 February 1926.

Family
He married twice: firstly in 1883 to Edith Isabel Sharp (d.1916); secondly in 1918 to Mrs Florence Ethel Mabel Hallett, a widow.

Artistic Recognition
There is a portrait of Hoyle in oils at the National Museum of Wales.

References

External links
 
 Hoyle Cephalopoda
 photo from Hoyle's cephalopod collection

1855 births
1926 deaths
English malacologists
Teuthologists
Directors of museums in the United Kingdom
People associated with Amgueddfa Cymru – Museum Wales
Manchester Museum people